An event in the Unified Modeling Language (UML) is a notable occurrence at a particular point in time. 

Events can, but do not necessarily, cause state transitions from one state to another in state machines represented by state machine diagrams. 

A transition between states occurs only when any guard condition for that transition are satisfied.

Unified Modeling Language
Data modeling
Terms in science and technology